Roelvink is a Dutch surname. Notable people with the surname include:

 Dries Roelvink (born 1959), Dutch singer
 Mirte Roelvink (born 1985), Dutch footballer

Dutch-language surnames
Surnames of Dutch origin